Step Into My Groove is the first single released by the band Altered State. Written by Gregory Markel, Curtis Mathewson and Chip Moreland. Step Into My Groove received radio and MTV airplay along with two alternate versions of the song that went to radio as well, the Psychedelic Mix and Psychedelic Instrumental recordings, produced by Ben Grosse.

References

1991 singles